Douglas K. S. Paisley is a Canadian alternative country singer and songwriter with record label No Quarter Records. He was born in Toronto. Paisley's "What About Us?" was featured in Mojo magazine as part of a complimentary CD entitled New Harvest. Paisley has previously toured with Bonnie Prince Billy under the name Dark Hand and Lamplight with artist Shary Boyle. Boyle would illuminate her art in the background while Paisley played the guitar and sang his songs. The pairing received recognition when they were selected to showcase at the Brooklyn Academy of Music in 2008. Doug performed for ten years alongside Chuck Erlichman as a duo entitled Russian Literature and as a tribute act entitled Stanley Brothers.

Paisley's 2010 release Constant Companion receives positive reviews in major publications such as The New Yorker and Spin.

Paisley has been featured both on CBC Radio in Canada and on National Public Radio in the United States.

His 2014 album Strong Feelings featured guest appearances by Mary Margaret O'Hara and Garth Hudson.  It received positive reviews from Rolling Stone and Pitchfork.

In 2018 Paisley released the album Starter Home, as well as contributing the song "Transient" to the compilation album The Al Purdy Songbook.

In November 2022, Paisley announced his forthcoming album, Say What You Like, which will be available March 17, 2023.

Albums
 Doug Paisley (No Quarter 2008)
 Digging in the Ground (EP, Download)
 Constant Companion (No Quarter 2010)
 No One But You / If I Wanted To (Heavenly, UK 7″ 45 RPM 2011)
 Golden Embers (EP, No Quarter 2012)
 Strong Feelings (No Quarter 2014)
 Until I Find You (EP, No Quarter 2014)
 Starter Home (No Quarter 2018)
 Say What You Like'' (Outside Music, 2023)

References

External links
 No Quarter Records

Canadian alternative country singers
Musicians from Toronto
Living people
Canadian country singer-songwriters
Canadian male singer-songwriters
Year of birth missing (living people)